This is a list of wars involving the Republic of Guinea.

References

 
Guinea
Wars